Llansadwrn is a small village and community in Carmarthenshire, Wales.

It is located in the countryside above the valley of the River Tywi, about halfway between Llandovery (Welsh: Llanymddyfri) to the north-east, and Llandeilo to the south-west. It is just off the A40 road, between Carmarthen (about 20 miles SW) and Brecon (about 25 miles E). The community is bordered by the Carmarthenshire communities of Cynwyl Gaeo, Llanwrda, Myddfai, Llangadog, Manordeilo and Salem, and Talley.

History
According to tradition, it was founded by an early Christian saint, Sadwrn (fl. around 460).

Four miles to the west of the village are the ruins of Talley Abbey.

One mile to the west is the hamlet of Waunclunda, and above Waunclunda is an ancient fort. Little information is available about this fort, but it is believed to have been an Iron Age and then a Roman fort. It is believed to be important for its potential archaeology.

The village is also believed to be the site of an important manor, Abermarlais Castle a fortified mansion, built in about the  C14 (Rees 1932), it was home to Sir Rhys ap Gruffydd who commanded the Welsh at Crécy (Jones 1987, 4). In the 1600s it was noted to have had 21 hearths - making it  a notable house. Also in the village is a Bronze age standing stone and Roman road.

References

External links

www.geograph.co.uk : photos of Llansadwrn and surrounding area
https://www.llansadwrn.org.uk/ community website
https://ancientmonuments.uk/129563-fan-camp-llansadwrn#.XEX4xlz7S00

Communities in Carmarthenshire
Villages in Carmarthenshire